Jagdish Narayan Meena is a politician of Rajasthan, India. He is currently the MLA for the Jamwa Ramgarh constituency of Rajasthan Legislative Assembly.

References

Living people
1963 births